Allamanda puberula (syn. Allamanda puberula var. glabrata Müll.Arg.) is a species of plant in the family Apocynaceae, which is native to Brazil, typically in Caatinga, and Cerrado vegetation. This plant is cited in Flora Brasiliensis by Carl Friedrich Philipp von Martius.

External links
 Allamanda puberula 
 Flora Brasiliensis: Allamanda puberula

puberula
Flora of Brazil